WAKE may refer to:

 WAKE (AM), a radio station (1500 AM) licensed to Valparaiso, Indiana, United States
 WAKE (cipher), Word Auto Key Encryption
 WAKE (novel), a young adult novel by Lisa McMann
 WAKE Radio, the student-operated radio station at Wake Forest University in Winston-Salem, North Carolina, United States
 Bade Airport, the airport in Papua, Indonesia, assigned ICAO code WAKE

See also
Wake (disambiguation)